Salem, Page County is an unincorporated community in Page County, in the U.S. state of Virginia.

The John Beaver House was listed on the National Register of Historic Places in 1979.

References

Unincorporated communities in Virginia
Unincorporated communities in Page County, Virginia